"Nothin' but the Wheel" is a song written by John Scott Sherrill, and recorded by American country music artist Patty Loveless.  It was released in July 1993 as the second single from the album Only What I Feel.  The song reached #20 on the Billboard Hot Country Singles & Tracks chart.

Content
The narrator talks about her journey driving down the highway in the early morning hours, after ending her relationship with her partner. She describes leaving everything behind and only has the wheel to hold onto as she drives along the highway.

Chart performance

References

1993 singles
1993 songs
Patty Loveless songs
Songs written by John Scott Sherrill
Song recordings produced by Emory Gordy Jr.
Epic Records singles